Tutwiler can refer to:

People
 Edward Magruder Tutwiler, Alabama industrialist
 Edward Magruder Tutwiler, Jr., college football player and coach, son of Edward Magruder Tutwiler
 Henry Tutwiler, educator and school founder; father of Julia Tutwiler
 Julia Tutwiler, prison reformer
 Margaret D. Tutwiler, politician

Places
 Tutwiler, Mississippi
 Julia Tutwiler Prison for Women, a prison located in Wetumpka, Alabama